Laurence Evan (27 October 1864 – 12 August 1894) was an Australian cricketer. He played two first-class matches for South Australia between 1885 and 1891.

See also
 List of South Australian representative cricketers

References

External links
 

1864 births
1894 deaths
Australian cricketers
South Australia cricketers
Cricketers from Adelaide